"No Man's Woman" is a song recorded by Irish singer Sinéad O'Connor for her fifth studio album Faith and Courage (2000). It was released as the album's lead single on 21 April 2000, by Atlantic Records.

Background and composition
"No Man's Woman", the lead single from the album Faith and Courage, was sent to pop and rock stations on 21 April 2000. Andy Murray, marketing director of Warner Music Europe, commented: "It's the right time for her to break her silence. The single is very commercial and everybody seems to think it's her best album since her first record. The marketing campaign is about reminding people who she is. But actually, despite the long gap, nobody seems to need reminding. There's a real excitement around the record, which has surprised a lot of people".

According to Nigel Williamson of Music & Media, O'Connor set out "her stall as strong and forceful young woman" on the song.

The singer commented on the lyrics of the song:
"It talks about a soul, a female soul who does not want to be a girlfriend or a wife, but wants to be single, really, but who is very much in love with the spirit of men and wants to conduct a relationship with the spirit of men. The song also honors the woman's soul, [which] feels that her teachers will be men, her guides will be men, and her rescuers have been men. Not romantically, though, but spiritually".

Critical reception
MTV News called the song "autobiographical" and "anthemic".

Music video
The music video was directed by Mike Lipscombe. According to O'Connor, "The video shows kind of a symbolic death and rebirth which takes place, and which helps this woman's soul to become more of herself by following the guidance of particular male religious instructors. It's very much a song that honors man. It's interesting how people think if you reject men sexually, that this means you're somehow rejecting them entirely. But in fact, sometimes it's easier to be intimate with men when there isn't that threat of sexuality or whatever". The video was nominated at the 2000 Billboard Music Awards in the category of Best Jazz/AC Video.

Usage in media
"No Man's Woman" was used on the pilot of TV series Alias in 2001, Sydney Bristow (played by Jennifer Garner) escapes with a prototype, and delivers it to Arvin Sloane (played by Ron Rifkin).

Track listing
US and European CD single
 "No Man's Woman" (Album Version) – 3:02
 "This Is a Rebel Song" (Remix) – 3:54
 "Her Mantle So Green" – 2:04

Charts

References

2000 songs
Songs written by Sinéad O'Connor
Sinéad O'Connor songs
Songs written by Anne Preven
Songs written by Scott Cutler
2000 singles
Music videos directed by Mike Lipscombe